Lottie Briscoe (April 19, 1883 – March 21, 1950) was an American stage and silent screen actress. She began in theatre at the age of four and as an adult was among the first to find success after making the transition from the legitimate stage to cinema. Briscoe appeared in over 94 motion pictures; she is perhaps best remembered for her time at Lubin Studios with co-star Arthur V. Johnson.

Family
Lottie Briscoe was born in St. Louis, Missouri to Mr. and Mrs. T. D. Briscoe. Her father may have been involved in theatre work and her mother was known to the theatre community as a likable stage mother. A sister, Olive Helen Briscoe, had long a career in vaudeville as a singer and comedian.
  At the time of her death The New York Times reported that Briscoe was 79 years old, which is unlikely, for it is well documented that she was active as a child actor as late as 1895. A possible explanation may lie with confusion  involving Briscoe’s frail husband, Harry Mountford, who at the time was 79 and had not long to live.

Stage

Briscoe first appeared on stage at the age of four, and by nine she was touring as Editha in Gus Thomas' adaptation of Frances Burnett's children's story  Editha's Burglar.  Three years later, in June 1895, she was engaged at the Fifth Avenue Theatre, New York, to play Julian Esmond in the Russ Whytal melodrama For Fair Virginia, but was replaced after just two nights when the mayor's office determined that the weather was too hot for a child under sixteen to be working in. Briscoe eventually did return to For Fair Virginia to play Julian Esmond over a subsequent road tour that lasted well into the spring of 1897. The following season she began a long tour playing Asa opposite Paul Gilmore in Lost River; advertised as a pastoral  melodrama by Joseph Arthur. In 1905 Briscoe toured in the Harry McRae Webster military drama Lieutenant Dick, U. S. A. playing Machita to Webster's Sergeant Jones. By this time, Briscoe and Webster had been married for two years.

Film

Around 1909 Briscoe, along with Harry McRae Webster, joined the fledgling Essanay Studios, Chicago. At least two films during this period, both one-reelers from January 1911, are known to exist today; The Sophomore’s Romance and A Sin Unpardonable. In June 1911 she played Zenia in Essanay's His Friend's Wife, remembered for Francis X. Bushman's film debut. Her peak years were with Lubin Studios in short films that often cast her with  the actor-director Arthur V. Johnson. Their most ambitious project together during this period was probably The Belovéd Adventurer (1914), a 15-episode serial written by Emmett Campbell Hall. When Johnson died in January 1916, shortly after  the release of their latest film, the Maie B. Hovey story The Lost Rose, Briscoe left film and did not return until 1918, and then only briefly to play Gertie Farish in The House of Mirth.

Later years
In 1919 Briscoe began a long run in vaudeville playing the title role in a domestic comedy by George Kelly entitled Mrs. Wellington's Surprise. That October 19 she was among a group of celebrities who performed at the Manhattan Opera House in a benefit on behalf of the Chelsea Memorial Association in raising funds for the Chelsea Park Memorial in Manhattan. One of a number of such memorials erected in the city during this time honoring local residents who gave their lives during the First World War. In February 1922 Briscoe signed to appear in a leading role with William Faversham in The Squaw Man. At some point in the not too distant future serious health issues would leave Briscoe homebound for the remainder of her life.

Harry McRae Webster became a motion picture director of some note before he was sued in the early 1920s by a film studio over the unauthorized use of nude models in one of his movies. Her second husband, Harry Mountford, served as a longtime executive secretary for the White Rats actors union.

Briscoe died on March 21, 1950, in New York, and her husband died on June 5, 1950.

Selected filmography
His Wife's Friend (1911)
The Shadow of Tragedy (1914)
The House of Mirth (1918)

References

External links
 
 Harry Mountford and Lottie Briscoe papers, 1871-1950 (bulk 1906-1935), held by the Billy Rose Theatre Division, New York Public Library for the Performing Arts

1883 births
1950 deaths
American stage actresses
American silent film actresses
Vaudeville performers
American child actresses
Actresses from St. Louis
20th-century American actresses